Quatre Sou Quatre (born January 1, 1904 in Takaba, Chad, and died March 23, 1963) was a politician from Chad who served in the French National Assembly from 1951-1955 .

References 
 page on the French National Assembly website

1904 births
1963 deaths
People from Mandoul Region
Chadian politicians
Rally of the French People politicians
Deputies of the 2nd National Assembly of the French Fourth Republic